Grażyna Błęcka-Kolska (born 16 February 1962) is a Polish actress. She has appeared in 22 films and television shows since 1988. She starred in Johnnie Waterman, which was screened in the Un Certain Regard section at the 1994 Cannes Film Festival.

She is the ex-wife of film director Jan Jakub Kolski.

Selected filmography
 Burial of a Potato (1990)
 Johnnie Waterman (1994)
 Pornografia (2003)

References

External links

1962 births
20th-century Polish actresses
Actors from Łódź
Living people
Polish film actresses
Polish stage actresses
Polish television actresses